Sultan Mizan Zainal Abidin Stadium is a Football stadium in Kuala Nerus, Terengganu, Malaysia. Together with the adjacent Mini Stadium, it forms the centrepiece of Terengganu Sports Complex. It was used for football matches. The stadium holds 50,000 people and is named after the  reigning Terengganu Ruler,  Sultan Mizan Zainal Abidin. The biggest stadium in the East Coast region of Peninsular Malaysia, it was built to replace Sultan Ismail Nasiruddin Shah Stadium as the state's main stadium.

It is the current home ground of Terengganu FC.

History
Sultan Mizan Zainal Abidin Stadium was officially opened by the current Sultan of Terengganu, Sultan Mizan Zainal Abidin whom was also himself by then the 13th Yang di-Pertuan Agong on 10 May 2008. Its first major use was for the main venue of the 12th edition of Sukma Games, the 2008 Sukma Games.

First collapse of the roof
On 2 June 2009, a major part of the roof construction collapsed under normal weather conditions, including the section above the royal box. It was only about a year after the stadium was officially opened. Witness accounts indicated that a long loud sound similar to a jet engine noise was heard as the roof fell to earth in pieces. A number of staff were in the stadium during the collapse, with preparations for varsity staff games being made. In addition to the games getting cancelled, many pieces of equipment were either damaged or destroyed and vehicles parked nearby being damaged. Fortunately, no casualties were reported.

The major cause for the collapse of the roof was identified to be the design fault and inappropriate materials. There were also reports of sporadic loud bangs and structure damage prior to the collapse. One of the structural repair jobs on the roof was scheduled on the day of the collapse itself, along with some electrical repair works being carried out on other part of the stadium. As of June 2010, the cleaning work and relocation of the collapsed roof were not finished.

On 19 December 2011, Terengganu Menteri Besar Ahmad Said confirmed that the stadium would be repaired by early 2012 with alterations to its roof design, mulling it to be similar with that of the Bukit Jalil National Stadium. Stadium architect, Michael KC Cheah, was surprisingly reselected to design the roof for the rebuild.

Second collapse of the roof
On 20 February 2013, the stadium's roof collapsed again while undergoing re-construction work which commenced in late 2012. 137 meters (two-thirds of the old structure) collapsed when working construction workers heard loud noises, followed by the collapse of steel pillars. The collapse caused injuries to 5 workers with 3 of them suffering serious injuries.

In October 2014, the stadium undergo a RM26 million repair funded by the Terengganu state government and supervised by the Public Works Department (PWD) involving 14 contractors.

Original architect, Michael KC Cheah, was removed from the project due to "creative differences".

In early January 2018, the stadium roof will undergo re-construction again.

Upgrading the pitch
In April 2019, as part of the Malaysian Football League (MFL) initiative to improve the quality of Malaysian football stadiums, the stadium's pitch were upgraded through the MFL's pilot project to restore field quality. The stadium pitch is now being carpeted with Bermuda grass and the re-turfing cost RM1 million, sponsored by MFL.

On 1 February 2020, the damaged running track cause by the collapse of the roof will be replaced with artificial grass and will look exactly like the Tan Sri Dato' Haji Hassan Yunos Stadium. As a result of this, the stadium will be dedicated for football use only.

Events
2008 Sukma Games: Terengganu

Politics

The stadium's fate was overseen by the opposition as a part of the administration by the former Barisan Nasional government led by then Menteri Besar Idris Jusoh. Idris was removed from Wisma Darul Iman following a fallout with the Terengganu Palace shortly after the 2008 general elections, an event that formed the background of the 2008 Terengganu constitutional crisis. As a result, his replacement Ahmad Said's earliest duty was to attend the officiating of the stadium.

See also
 Sport in Malaysia

References

External links 

Photo of collapsed roof
Stadium roof collapses.
Stadium Picture.

Kuala Nerus District
Football venues in Malaysia
Athletics (track and field) venues in Malaysia
Multi-purpose stadiums in Malaysia
Sports venues in Terengganu
2008 establishments in Malaysia
Terengganu FC
Building collapses in Malaysia